Ricky Richardo Kambuaya (born 5 May 1996), is an Indonesian professional footballer who plays as a midfielder for Liga 1 club Persib Bandung and the Indonesia national team.

Club career

PS Mojokerto Putra
In 2017, Kambuaya signed a year contract with PS Mojokerto Putra. Kambuaya scored ten goals in the 2017 season, when PSMP played in the second division.

PSS Sleman
On 28 January 2019, Kambuaya signed a year contract with PSS Sleman along other players, Derry Rachman, Haris Tuharea, and Jajang Sukmara. Kambuaya made his league debut in a 3–1 win against Arema on 15 May as a substitute for Brian Ferreira in the 85th minute.

Persebaya Surabaya
On 2 January 2020, Kambuaya signed a year contract with Persebaya Surabaya. On 11 January 2020, Kambuaya start unofficial debut for Persebaya Surabaya on friendly match vs Persis Solo. And one month later, Kambuaya made his first league debut in a 1–1 draw against Persik Kediri on 29 February as a substitute for Hambali Tolib in the 48th minute. And a month later, This season was suspended on 27 March 2020 due to the COVID-19 pandemic. The season was abandoned and was declared void on 20 January 2021. On 4 September 2021, Kambuaya scored his first goal for Persebaya in a 3–1 loss over Borneo at the Wibawa Mukti Stadium.

Persib Bandung
Kambuaya was signed for Persib Bandung to play in Liga 1 in the 2022–23 season. He made his league debut on 7 August 2022 in a match against Borneo at the Segiri Stadium, Samarinda.

International career
In September 2021, Kambuaya was called up to the Indonesia national team for first time in 2 match against Chinese Taipei in the 2023 AFC Asian Cup qualification – Play-off Round by Shin Tae-yong.
He made his official international debut on 7 October 2021, against Chinese Taipei in a 2023 AFC Asian Cup qualification Play-off Round match. 4 days later, he made first international goal against Chinese Taipei in a 2023 AFC Asian Cup qualification Play-off Round leg 2, in which Indonesia won 3–0. In his next appearance on 25 November 2021, Kambuaya scored opening goal in a win 4–1 over Myanmar. In December 2021, Kambuaya was named in Indonesia's squad for the 2020 AFF Championship. In the second leg final against Thailand on 1 January 2022, he scored Indonesia's opening goal in the first half, although the match ended in a 2–2 draw with Changsuek team, 6–2 aggregate score and Thailand became champions, However, what was interesting in the match was the figure of Kambuaya, he managed to become the Man of the match.

Career statistics

Club

International

International goals

Honours

Club
Persebaya Surabaya
 East Java Governor Cup: 2020

International
Indonesia
 AFF Championship runner-up: 2020
Indonesia Olympic
 Southeast Asian Games  Bronze medal: 2021

References

External links 
 
 Ricky Kambuaya at Liga Indonesia

1996 births
Living people
People from Sorong
Indonesian footballers
Association football midfielders
PSS Sleman players
PS Mojokerto Putra players
Persebaya Surabaya players
Persib Bandung players
Liga 1 (Indonesia) players
Indonesia international footballers
Competitors at the 2021 Southeast Asian Games
Southeast Asian Games bronze medalists for Indonesia
Southeast Asian Games medalists in football